The Bird of Happiness is a 1993 Spanish drama film directed by Pilar Miró. It was screened in the Un Certain Regard section at the 1993 Cannes Film Festival.

Cast
 Mercedes Sampietro - Carmen
 Aitana Sánchez-Gijón - Nani
 José Sacristán - Eduardo
 Carlos Hipólito - Enrique Jr.
 Lluís Homar - Fernando
 Daniel Dicenta - Enrique
 Mari Carmen Prendes - Madre
 Jordi Torras - Padre
 Asunción Balaguer - Señora Rica
 Ana Gracia - Chica Agencia
 Eulalia Ramón - Elisa
 Antonio Canal - Sergio
 Felipe Vélez - Asaltante
 Diego Carvajal - Mauro
 Rafael Ramos de Castro - Ayudante Dirección
 Gabriel Garbisu - Carlos

References

External links

1993 films
1990s Spanish-language films
1993 drama films
Films directed by Pilar Miró
Films shot in Almería
Spanish drama films
1990s Spanish films